An auditor general, also known in some countries as a comptroller general or comptroller and auditor general, is a senior civil servant charged with improving government accountability by auditing and reporting on the government's operations.

Frequently, the institution headed by the auditor general is a member of the International Organization of Supreme Audit Institutions (INTOSAI).

Auditors general of governments
Auditor-General of Australia 
Comptroller and Auditor General of Bangladesh
Auditor General of Canada
Auditor General of British Columbia
Auditor General of Newfoundland and Labrador
Auditor General of Ontario
Auditor General of Quebec
Auditor General of China
 Supreme Audit Office (Czech Republic)
Auditor-General of Ghana
Director of Audit (Hong Kong)
Comptroller and Auditor General of India
Comptroller and Auditor General (Ireland)
Comptroller and Auditor General for Jersey
Office of the Auditor-General (Kenya)
Auditor General of Pakistan
Auditor General for Scotland
Auditor-General (South Africa)
Auditor General of Sri Lanka
Auditor General for Wales
Auditor-General of New South Wales
Controller and Auditor-General of New Zealand
Comptroller and Auditor General for Northern Ireland
Comptroller and Auditor General (United Kingdom)
Comptroller General of the United States
Control Yuan of the Republic of China (on Taiwan since 1949)

See also
Chief audit executive
Comptroller
Comptroller of the Household
Director of Audit (disambiguation)
International Organization of Supreme Audit Institutions
Treasurer